T1International is a not for profit organization that advocates for people with type 1 diabetes. It launched the insulin4all social media campaign and organised two high profile protests outside Ely Lilly and Company headquarters.

History 
T1International was founded by Elizabeth Pfiester in 2014. The group has a focus on the affordability and accessibility of insulin.

Activities 
T1International's global headquarters are based in London, England, and their work includes Africa, Europe, Asia, and North America.

T1International launched the social media insulin4all campaign and has held two protests outside the headquarters of Eli Lilly and Company. The second protest included a confrontation between company executive and the mother of Alec Smith, who died in 2017, after rationing insulin manufactured by Eli Lilly.

T1International does a twice-annual survey to determine what people are paying for insulin throughout the world.

See also 

 Campaign for Access to Essential Medicines
 Universities Allied for Essential Medicines

References

External links 
 T1International - Official webpage

Intellectual property activism
Health activism
Pharmaceuticals policy
Health charities in the United Kingdom
Organizations established in 2014
Diabetes organizations